Laura Donghi (born 21 November 1980) is an Italian former football midfielder who played for Fiammamonza and Calcio Chiasiellis of Serie A. With Fiammamonza she also played in the UEFA Women's Cup.

References

1980 births
Living people
Italian women's footballers
Women's association football midfielders
A.S.D. Calcio Chiasiellis players
ASD Fiammamonza 1970 players